Tenywa "T-Bone" Bonseu (born October 28, 1976 in Kampala) is a retired Ugandan footballer, who played nine years of professional soccer in the United States.

Career

Amateur and college

Bonseu began his career playing for Horizon FC in his native Uganda, before coming to the United States in 1997 to attend and play college soccer for Martin Methodist College in rural Tennessee after a trial with a club in the Japanese J-League.

Professional
Bonseu joined the Pittsburgh Riverhounds of the A-League in 1999 and played there for two seasons, before signing with the Major League Soccer's Chicago Fire. Bonseu went on to spend several seasons in MLS, playing with the Columbus Crew in 2001, Dallas Burn in 2002 and 2003, and the MetroStars, who acquired Tenywa from Dallas for Steve Jolley before the 2004 season. In five seasons in MLS, Bonseu played in 87 regular season and 11 playoff games (starting all but three).

After being released by the MetroStars, Bonseu played four seasons with the Rochester Rhinos in the USL First Division from 2005 through 2008, before signing for Pittsburgh Riverhounds in 2009.

International
Bonseu was one of the youngest players ever selected to appear for the national team of Uganda. He has 21 appearances for Uganda.

References

External links

1976 births
Living people
Chicago Fire FC players
Columbus Crew players
Expatriate soccer players in the United States
FC Dallas players
Major League Soccer players
UT Southern FireHawks men's soccer players
New York Red Bulls players
Sportspeople from Kampala
Pittsburgh Riverhounds SC players
Rochester New York FC players
Ugandan expatriate footballers
Ugandan footballers
Uganda international footballers
USL First Division players
A-League (1995–2004) players
USL Second Division players
Association football defenders
Ugandan expatriate sportspeople in the United States